Librado Rivera (August 17, 1864 - March 1, 1932) was an anarchist during the Mexican Revolution. He co-published the anarchist newspaper Regeneración with Jesús Flores Magón and Ricardo Flores Magón. He took over editorial duties for the anarcho-syndicalist newspaper Sagitario in 1924.

Biography

Librado Rivera was born on August 17, 1864, in Mexico.

He was arrested and convicted under the Espionage Act of 1917 in the United States, then sentenced to 15 years in prison. He served a total of 5 years at McNeil Island and Leavenworth Prison.

He was deported from the United States to Mexico in 1923.

He died in Mexico City on March 1, 1932, of tetanus following a car accident.

Footnotes

Further reading

 John W. Sherman, "Revolution on Trial: The 1909 Tombstone Proceedings Against Ricardo Flores Magón, Antonio Villarreal, and Librado Rivera," Journal of Arizona History vol. 32, no. 2 (Summer 1991), pp. 173–194. In JSTOR

External links 
 
 Regeneración Site, from Five Views: An Ethnic Historic Site Survey for California (Mexican Americans)
 "Sagitario, el instrumento periodístico de la continuidad" (background and archive) at Biblioteca Antorcha

1864 births
1932 deaths
Mexican anarchists
Mexican atheists
Mexican journalists
Male journalists
Mexican rebels
Mexican revolutionaries
Mexican syndicalists
Anarcho-communists
Anarcho-syndicalists
People of the Mexican Revolution
People convicted under the Espionage Act of 1917
Mexican people imprisoned abroad
People deported from the United States
Deaths from tetanus